Dibrospidium chloride, also known as spirobromin, is a drug being investigated to treat bone cancer. It has potential anti-inflammatory and anti-neoplastic properties. It is an alkylating antineoplastic agent.

Dibrospidium chloride and related compounds were developed in Russia in the 1980s. It is currently used in Russia as a cytostatic antitumor chemotherapeutic drug.

References 

Experimental cancer drugs
Alkylating antineoplastic agents
Quaternary ammonium compounds
Spiro compounds
Nitrogen heterocycles
Organobromides
Chlorides
Amides